Warhorse was a British rock band formed by Deep Purple's first bassist Nick Simper.

Career 
After being sacked by Deep Purple in 1969, Simper joined Marsha Hunt's backing band. Not long after, Simper replaced her backing band with Ged Peck on guitar and Mac Poole on drums. When Hunt became pregnant, the band stopped touring, and Simper and Peck re-organized the group as Warhorse. Ashley Holt became the band's singer, and they recruited keyboardist Rick Wakeman. When their first demo was recorded in April 1970, Wakeman left to join the Strawbs and was replaced by Frank Wilson.

Warhorse signed to Vertigo, and released their first album, Warhorse in November 1970. Warhorse was managed by Ron Hire, originally part of HEC Enterprises, the original investors in Deep Purple.

The band began to tour, but made little progress, and the album failed to chart. A single, "St. Louis", was released, which failed to chart. By 1971, after arguments about style, Peck left and moved to classical guitar playing. He was replaced by Pete Parks.

In June 1972, their next album, Red Sea, was released, but soon after Warhorse was dropped from the label. Around the same time, Poole decided to leave Warhorse for Gong. The band carried on, and replaced Poole with Barney James. Rick Wakeman remembered Ashley Holt and Barney James and recruited both when he formed his band The English Rock Ensemble for his solo albums, Journey to the Centre of the Earth and The Myths and Legends of King Arthur and the Knights of the Round Table. Warhorse's last concert in 1974 was at Polhill College, Bedford.

Warhorse musicians (Holt, Parks, Simper, Wilson, and Poole) have since played together on several occasions, including 1985 and 2005, latterly for drummer Poole's 60th birthday. Poole died on 21 May 2015.

Personnel

Members 
 Ashley Holt - lead vocals (1970-1974, 1985, 2005)
 Nick Simper - bass guitar (1970-1974, 1985, 2005)
 Mac Poole - drums (1970-1972, 1985, 2005; died 2015)
 Ged Peck - guitar (1970-1971; died 2015)
 Rick Wakeman - keyboards (1970)
 Frank Wilson - keyboards (1970-1974, 1985, 2005)
 Pete Parks - guitar (1971-1974, 1985, 2005)
 Barney James - drums (1972-1974; died 2016)

Line-ups

Discography

Albums
 Warhorse (1970)
 Red Sea (1972)

Compilation albums
 Best of Warhorse (1986)
 Outbreak of Hostilities (1991)

References

External links 
 [ Allmusic.com Overview for Warhorse]
 Discography @ Disocgs.com
 Rick Wakeman The Myths and Legends
 Nick Simper's web site

Musical groups established in 1970
English rock music groups
English progressive rock groups
Vertigo Records artists
1970 establishments in England
Musical groups disestablished in 1974
1974 disestablishments in England